Antoinette Hatfield Hall, formerly known as the New Theatre Building, is a  complex located in Portland, Oregon, in the United States. It is one of three buildings in the Portland'5 Centers for the Arts (formerly known as PCPA), which also includes Arlene Schnitzer Concert Hall and Keller Auditorium. Hatfield Hall contains the Dolores Winningstad Theatre, Newmark Theatre, and Brunish Theatre (formerly Brunish Hall). It was dedicated in honor of Antoinette Hatfield, the former First Lady of Oregon from 1959 to 1967 and the wife of former U.S. Senator and Oregon governor Mark Hatfield.

Construction 

Hatfield Hall was built at a cost of $28.4 million and opened in 1987 as the New Theatre Building. It was designed by Broome, Oringdulph, O'Toole, Rudolf, Boles & Associates, Barton Myers, and ELS of Berkeley, California.

Theatre venues 
Antoinette Hatfield Hall is part of the Portland'5 Centers for the Arts (formerly known as PCPA), which also includes Arlene Schnitzer Concert Hall and Keller Auditorium. Three theatre venues are contained in Hatfield Hall: Dolores Winningstad Theatre, the Newmark Theatre, and Brunish Theatre. Known for 19 years as the New Theatre Building, Hatfield Hall was dedicated December 13, 2007, in honor of Antoinette Hatfield, wife of former U.S. Senator and Oregon governor Mark Hatfield.

Dolores Winningstad Theatre 
Located inside Antoinette Hatfield Hall, Dolores Winningstad Theatre is named in honor of the wife of Norman Winningstad, who made a generous donation in 1984. This venue has 304 seats and is a courtyard-style theatre with flexible seating arrangements.

Newmark Theatre 
An Edwardian-style theatre with 880 seats, the Newmark was named in honor of Herb and Jeanne Mittleman Newmark in 1997.

Brunish Theatre 
With a capacity of 200 seats, Brunish Theatre (formerly Brunish Hall) was named in honor of Corey Brunish's mother. This true black box theatre venue may be configured for "meetings, dinners, conferences, weddings, and performances".

See also
 Folly Bollards (1998), a series of bollards along Main Street, in front of the hall
 Mago Hermano (Brother Wizard or Magician), Alejandro Colunga's 2003 sculpture, located in the hall's lobby

References

External links

 Portland Center for the Performing Arts

1987 establishments in Oregon
Theatres completed in 1987
Music venues in Portland, Oregon
Performing arts centers in Oregon
Theatres in Portland, Oregon